Night of the Humans is a book in the Doctor Who New Series Adventures line, released on 22 April 2010. It was written by David Llewellyn, and features the Eleventh Doctor and Amy Pond as his companion.

Plot

The Doctor and Amy are caught in the middle of a war between humans and Sittuns on the junkyard planet of the Gyre, and when the Doctor disappears, Amy teams up with a mysterious space traveller to rescue him, little knowing the dangers she has put herself in.

Reviews

References

External links 

2010 British novels
2010 science fiction novels
Eleventh Doctor novels
Novels set on fictional planets